Liverpool Kirkdale by-election may refer to:

 1898 Liverpool Kirkdale by-election
 1907 Liverpool Kirkdale by-election
 1910 Liverpool Kirkdale by-election
 1915 Liverpool Kirkdale by-election